Baghdasar or Bagdasar (Բաղդասար) is an Armenian male name, a form of Belshazzar.

Name

 Baghdasar Arzoumanian, Armenian architect and designer
 Baghdasar Tbir, Armenian poet, musician, scientist, printer, and a luminary of national and educational movements.
 Baghdasar - one of a pair of twin heroes in the Armenian epic "Daredevils of Sassoun".

Surname
Romanian surname, notable people with the surname include:

Florica Bagdasar (1901–1978), Romanian physician
Nicolae Bagdasar (1896–1971), Romanian philosopher

Derived surnames
 Armenian: Baghdasarian, Bagdasarian, Bagdasaryan or Baghdasaryan
 Russian form of Armenian surname: Bagdasarov, Bagdasaroff 
 Semyon Bagdasarov
 Armen Bagdasarov

References

Armenian masculine given names
Romanian-language surnames